SM UB-45 was a Type UB II submarine or U-boat built for and operated by the German Imperial Navy during World War I. UB-45 operated in the Mediterranean and the Black Seas, and was sunk by a mine in November 1916.

UB-45 was ordered in July 1915 and was laid down at the AG Weser shipyard in Bremen in September. She was equipped to carry a complement of four torpedoes for her two bow torpedo tubes and had an  deck gun. As part of a group of six submarines selected for Mediterranean service, UB-45 was broken into railcar-sized components and shipped to Pola where she was assembled and then launched and commissioned in May 1916.

In early November 1916, UB-45 was departing from the base at Varna, Bulgaria, when the U-boat struck a mine and sank rapidly. Fifteen of the twenty men on board were killed in the attack; one of the five crewmen rescued from UB-45 later died from his injuries. UB-45s wreck was located and raised by the Bulgarian Navy in the 1930s with an eye toward rebuilding the submarine. Engineers from AG Weser determined that restoration of the submarine was feasible, but this was never accomplished. Remains recovered from the wreck were buried in Varna after a funeral procession through town in November 1938.

Design and construction 
The German UB II design improved upon the design of the UB I boats, which had been ordered in September 1914. In service, the UB I boats were found to be too small and too slow. A major problem was that, because they had a single propeller shaft/engine combo, if either component failed, the U-boat became almost totally disabled. To rectify this flaw, the UB II boats featured twin propeller shafts and twin engines (one shaft for each engine), which also increased the U-boat's top speed. The new design also included more powerful batteries, larger torpedo tubes, and a deck gun. As a UB II boat, U-45 could also carry twice the torpedo load of her UB I counterparts, and nearly ten times as much fuel. To contain all of these changes the hull was larger, and the surface and submerged displacement was more than double that of the UB I boats.

She had a single hull with saddle tanks and had a draught of  when surfaced. She displaced  while submerged but only  on the surface.

The submarine was equipped with twin Daimler diesel engines and twin Siemens-Schuckert electric motors—for surfaced and submerged running, respectively. Her electric motors and batteries provided a range of at  while submerged. UB-45 was equipped with two  bow torpedo tubes and could carry four torpedoes. The U-boat was also armed with one  Uk L/30 deck gun.

UB-45 was laid down by AG Weser at its Bremen shipyard on 3 September 1915. As one of six U-boats selected for service in the Mediterranean while under construction, UB-45 was broken into railcar-sized components and shipped overland to the Austro-Hungarian port of Pola. Shipyard workers from Weser assembled the boat and her five sisters at Pola, where she was launched on 12 May 1916.

Service career 
SM UB-45 was commissioned into the German Imperial Navy on 26 May 1916 under the command of Oberleutnant zur See Karl Palis. UB-45, Palis' second U-boat command, was assigned to the Navy's Pola Flotilla. Although the flotilla was based in Pola, the site of the main Austro-Hungarian Navy base, boats of the flotilla operated out of the Austro-Hungarian base at Cattaro which was located farther south and closer to the Mediterranean. German U-boats typically returned to Pola only for repairs.

In mid-July, UB-45s first success occurred when in three days she sank two steamers. The first, Virginia, was sunk on the 16th while carrying salt destined for Calcutta. The 4,721 GRT Ville de Rouen would be UB-45s largest victim.

Germany's conquest of Romania provided the German Imperial Navy with sufficient fuel oil for submarines to operate in the Black Sea. UB-45 and three of her sister ships in the Pola Flotilla were ordered to Constantinople and, en route, had to navigate through the Dardanelles, which had been heavily mined by the Allies in the middle of 1916. UB-45 joined the Constantinople Flotilla on 12 August.

The German submarines in the Black Sea accomplished little, sinking only six ships between August and the end of the year; UB-45 accounted for two of these while in the Black Sea. On 31 August, UB-45 sank the 2,660 GRT Italian steamer Tevere off Poti. Tevere had been requisitioned by the Imperial Russian Navy and was in use as a transport ship at the time. Gioconda was the last ship sunk by UB-45.

At 14:30 on 6 November, UB-45 was departing Varna, Bulgaria, under escort by the Bulgarian torpedo boat Strogi that had cleared a path through Russian mines. At what was thought to be the edge of the minefield, UB-45 swung around Strogis port side directly into a second minefield that had been laid by Russian forces the night before. A Hertz horn mine exploded between UB-45s control room and engine room with enough force to break the boat in half. UB-45 sank so rapidly that the only survivors were three men on the conning tower and two on deck, all of whom were injured; the other fifteen men on board perished in the attack. One of the survivors died from the severity of his wounds the following day.

In 1932, the Bulgarian Navy conceived a plan to search for the wreck of UB-45 with the intent of raising it for restoration as a training vessel, or, at the very least, to recover the sunken U-boat's  deck gun. An additional consideration was the recovery of the remains of UB-45s crew. On 19 July 1934, after a two-year search, Bulgarian minesweepers discovered the location of the wreck, which was resting at position , near the then Bulgarian–Romanian border. UB-45s wreck was raised in an operation that cost several times less than the cost of a new 8.8-centimeter gun. The remains recovered were buried on 26 February 1936 in a Varna cemetery, after a procession through the town.

Engineers from AG Weser, UB-45s German builder, inspected the hulk and determined that repair of the wreck was feasible. A restoration of the submarine to operating condition, as either a training vessel or a military, would cost 21 million leva (about US$250,000 in 1936 dollars), significantly less than the 56 to 65 million leva ($680,000 to $790,000) that a comparable new submarine would cost. Ultimately, the Bulgarian Navy opted to order new submarines from Germany rather than repair UB-45. UB-45s deck gun was reused, however, and one of the U-boat's diesel engines was restored to operating condition and used on the training ship Assen.

Summary of raiding history

Notes

References

Bibliography 

 

 
 
 
 
 
 
 
 

 

German Type UB II submarines
U-boats commissioned in 1916
World War I submarines of Germany
Maritime incidents in 1916
U-boats sunk in 1916
U-boats sunk by mines
World War I shipwrecks in the Black Sea
1916 ships